The Bhil Kataria are a sub-division of the Bhil community found in the state of Rajasthan in India. They are known as Kataria Bhil because they inhabit the Kataria region of Rajasthan. It is an area that covers parts of the districts of Udaipur, Dungarpur and Banswara.

Their clans are known as atak, and there are said to be at least eighty four ataks. The Kataria are a community of small and medium-sized farmers. Most of their settlements are exclusively Kataria, and each of them contains an informal caste association. This acts as an instrument of social control, punishing those who transgress community norms. They are Hindu and unlike other Bhil groups do not have ancestral non Hindu tribal deities. The Kataria speak the Bagri dialect of Rajasthani.

Marriage 

Like other Bhil groups, they are endogamous.

See also 
  Bhil Gametia
  Bhil Mama
  Kataria

References

Bhil
Scheduled Tribes of Rajasthan